Troitsk is the name of several inhabited localities in Russia.

Modern localities
Urban localities
Troitsk, Chelyabinsk Oblast, a town in Chelyabinsk Oblast; 
Troitsk, Moscow, a town in Troitsk Settlement of Troitsky Administrative Okrug in the federal city of Moscow

Rural localities
Troitsk, Kalmansky District, Altai Krai, a settlement in Kalmansky Selsoviet of Kalmansky District in Altai Krai; 
Troitsk, Kulundinsky District, Altai Krai, a selo in Oktyabrsky Selsoviet of Kulundinsky District in Altai Krai; 
Troitsk, Yeltsovsky District, Altai Krai, a settlement in Pushtulimsky Selsoviet of Yeltsovsky District in Altai Krai; 
Troitsk, Republic of Bashkortostan, a village in Yamakayevsky Selsoviet of Blagovarsky District in the Republic of Bashkortostan; 
Troitsk, Tayshetsky District, Irkutsk Oblast, a village in Tayshetsky District of Irkutsk Oblast; 
Troitsk, Zalarinsky District, Irkutsk Oblast, a selo in Zalarinsky District of Irkutsk Oblast; 
Troitsk, Komi Republic, a village in Bogorodsk Selo Administrative Territory of Kortkerossky District in the Komi Republic; 
Troitsk, Abansky District, Krasnoyarsk Krai, a village in Nikolsky Selsoviet of Abansky District in Krasnoyarsk Krai
Troitsk, Bolsheuluysky District, Krasnoyarsk Krai, a village in Novonikolsky Selsoviet of Bolsheuluysky District in Krasnoyarsk Krai
Troitsk, Ilansky District, Krasnoyarsk Krai, a village in Yuzhno-Alexandrovsky Selsoviet of Ilansky District in Krasnoyarsk Krai
Troitsk, Taseyevsky District, Krasnoyarsk Krai, a selo in Troitsky Selsoviet of Taseyevsky District in Krasnoyarsk Krai
Troitsk, Republic of Mordovia, a selo in Troitsky Selsoviet of Kovylkinsky District in the Republic of Mordovia; 
Troitsk, Novosibirsk Oblast, a village in Kochenyovsky District of Novosibirsk Oblast; 
Troitsk, Krutinsky District, Omsk Oblast, a village in Tolokontsevsky Rural Okrug of Krutinsky District in Omsk Oblast; 
Troitsk, Tyukalinsky District, Omsk Oblast, a selo in Troitsky Rural Okrug of Tyukalinsky District in Omsk Oblast; 
Troitsk, Orenburg Oblast, a selo in Troitsky Selsoviet of Sol-Iletsky District in Orenburg Oblast
Troitsk, Chernushinsky District, Perm Krai, a village in Chernushinsky District of Perm Krai
Troitsk, Kungursky District, Perm Krai, a selo in Kungursky District of Perm Krai
Troitsk, Usolsky District, Perm Krai, a selo in Usolsky District of Perm Krai
Troitsk, Olyokminsky District, Sakha Republic, a selo in Troitsky Rural Okrug of Olyokminsky District in the Sakha Republic
Troitsk, Ust-Maysky District, Sakha Republic, a selo in Petropavlovsky Natsionalny Rural Okrug of Ust-Maysky District in the Sakha Republic

Alternative names
Troitsk, alternative name of Troinka, a selo in Dalny Selsoviet of Rubtsovsky District in Altai Krai; 
Troitsk, alternative name of Troitsky, a settlement in Bagdarinsky Selsoviet of Bauntovsky District in the Republic of Buryatia; 
Troitsk, alternative name of Troitskoye, a selo in Talovsky Selsoviet of Pribaykalsky District in the Republic of Buryatia; 
Troitsk, alternative name of Troitskoye, a village in Maloyaushskoye Rural Settlement of Vurnarsky District in the Chuvash Republic; 
Troitsk, alternative name of Troitskoye, a selo in Troitskaya Rural Territory of Izhmorsky District in Kemerovo Oblast; 
Troitsk, alternative name of Troitskoye, a selo in Troitsky Selsoviet of Petukhovsky District in Kurgan Oblast; 
Troitsk, alternative name of Troitskoye, a selo in Chistoozyorny District of Novosibirsk Oblast; 
Troitsk, alternative name of Troitsky, a settlement in Kochkovsky District of Novosibirsk Oblast;

See also
Troitsky (disambiguation)